Paramsacta moorei is a moth of the family Erebidae. It was described by Arthur Gardiner Butler in 1875. It is found in India and Pakistan. It has been recorded as a pest of finger millet, sorghum, and pearl millet.

References

Moths described in 1875
Spilosomina
Moths of Asia
Insect pests of millets